is a 1991 horizontally scrolling shooter video game developed by Quest and published by Palsoft and Turbo Technologies Inc. for the TurboGrafx-16. The game stars a young witch apprentice named Ripple, who broke a promise to her teacher by accidentally releasing six demons from a forbidden book, joined by her star companions Topsy and Turvy on a quest to catch and seal the demons back into the book.

Magical Chase was created by most of the same team at Quest that would go to work on Ogre Battle and Final Fantasy Tactics. The game was released in Japan in 1991 amid Palsoft's closure, resulting in a low print run before being re-released by Japanese magazine PC Engine Fan via mail order. It was graphically altered for its late 1993 North American release at the end of the TurboGrafx-16's lifecycle. It is considered by gaming journalists as one of the rarest, most valuable and sought-after TurboGrafx titles.

Magical Chase was met with positive reception from critics since its initial launch; it was praised for its colorful cartoon-like presentation, graphical effects, lack of slowdown, sound and gameplay. Retrospective commentary has been positive, with praise given to the use of parallax scrolling that pushed the TurboGrafx-16 to its limits. It was ported to Microsoft Windows in 1998 and Game Boy Color in 2000.

Gameplay 

Magical Chase is a horizontal-scrolling shoot 'em up game similar to Cotton and Gradius. The game stars a young witch named Ripple, an apprentice who broke a promise she made to her witch teacher by taking a peek inside a forbidden book and freeing six demons. Unless she can catch all six and get them back inside the book, the witch will turn Ripple into a frog. Ripple sets off on her quest with her two elf-star friends known as "Star Maidens": Topsy and Turvy, both of which act as satellite-like options.

There are a total of six levels in the game which can be played on easy, normal or hard difficulty settings. Only the first three can be played on the easy difficulty setting. As enemies are destroyed, they leave behind different colored gemstones which serve as the game's currency. During each level, a shop appears where power-ups, health, and extra lives can be purchased. Touching obstacles and the ground does not kill the player but it does impede progress. If the player gets trapped behind objects at the left-hand side of the screen, "scrolling damage" will occur. Every stage is presented with the name of the mid-boss encountered, and keeping with the magic theme, is titled as a magical seal. Each level has a mid-boss and end-boss.

Development and release 
Magical Chase was developed by most of the same team at Quest that would later go on to work on Ogre Battle and Final Fantasy Tactics. Hiroshi Minagawa served as art director and game designer of the project. The soundtrack was co-composed by Hitoshi Sakimoto and Masaharu Iwata (under the alias "Rezon"), with Sakimoto being requested by Iwata to work on the project. Iwata stated that it was a joy composing music for "such a good game", as he did not face struggle with the PC Engine hardware during development, regarding it to be the shooting game he liked the most scoring.

Magical Chase was originally launched for the PC Engine in Japan by Palsoft on November 15, 1991. Prior to release, the game was demonstrated at the 1991 Tokyo Toy Show during summer. Because of Palsoft going bankrupt at the time of its release, the title received a small print run and became a premium item in Japan due to being difficult to find. In response to the large demand from consumers, Japanese magazine PC Engine Fan re-released it as a "Fan Edition" via mail order. The game was initially slated for a November 1992 launch in North America before being published by Turbo Technologies Inc. between April and May of 1993. The North American release features extensively modified graphics for certain character sprites and the first stage compared to the original Japanese release. Its late 1993 release at the end of the TurboGrafx's lifespan in North America, coupled with extensive hype and only being available via mail order, makes the game harder to find and more expensive than earlier releases, becoming a rare collector's item that commands high prices on the secondary game collecting market.

Magical Chase was first ported to Windows 95 by RSP Team and published by Bothtec in Japan on April 10, 1998 and was later rereleased as a budget title on January 14, 2000. The Windows port is a straight conversion featuring Red Book audio. This port was also included as part of the Bothtec Game Pack 99 compilation. The game was later ported to Game Boy Color and published in Japan by Microcabin on August 4, 2000 under the title Magical Chase GB: Minarai Mahoutsukai Kenja no Tani e. This version faithfully reproduces the parallax scrolling effect, which was characteristic of the PC Engine original, but the visuals and music were simplified due to hardware limitations. Because of its inherited popularity and low print run, the GBC version fares high prices on the resale market. The intellectual property is currently owned by Square Enix, as per their buyout of Quest in 2002. In 2013, SuperSweep published an album featuring the game's original, arranged and prototype tracks.

Reception 

Magical Chase garnered positive reception from critics since its release. Fan reception was also positive; Readers of PC Engine Fan voted to give the game a 26.77 out of 30 score and ranking at the number 3 spot in a poll, indicating a very large popular following.

Famitsus four reviewers noted that it incorporated elements from R-Type, Super Mario World and Fantasy Zone. El Nionio and Rocket of Consoles + criticized its presentation but commended the detailed visuals, fast parallax scrolling, sound design, playability and longevity. Génération 4s Philippe Querleux highly praised the audiovisual presentation, animations and playability. Likewise, Joypads Jean-Marc Demoly and Joysticks Sébastien Hamon commended the animated visuals, sound and controls. Electronic Gaming Monthlys four reviewers gave positive remarks to its premise, solid gameplay, music, bizarre enemy designs and cutesy cartoon-like visuals. VideoGames & Computer Entertainments Josh Mandel compared its visual style with Air Zonk, giving positive remarks to its simplicity and ambitious graphical effects, lack of slowdown and adequate difficulty. AllGames Shawn Sackenheim praised Magical Chases colorful cartoon-esque visual presentation, comparing its wacky character designs with Parodius, lack of slowdown, sound design, moderate challenge and gameplay but criticized its short length. 

Retrospective commentary has been equally positive. Retro Gamers Damien McFerran regarded the TurboGrafx-16 original as one of the system's "perfect ten" games, stating that it is a solid shoot 'em up title past the cute visuals. IGNs Lucas M. Thomas placed both Magical Chase and Cotton: Fantastic Night Dreams as number four on the top ten list of TurboGrafx titles not released on the Virtual Console, stating that both games were different but shared the same general idea. Hardcore Gamers Michael Thomasson praised the game's use of parallax scrolling as a technical feat for the TurboGrafx-16. USgamers Jeremy Parish regarded it as a "shameless clone" of Cotton due to being released in a similar time frame but noted that its protagonist Ripple looks similar to the witch class in the Ogre Battle series. The Japanese book PC Engine Complete Guide 1987-1999 praised the original TurboGrafx-16 release for its carefully hand-drawn characters and backgrounds, use of parallax scrolling that pushed the system to its limits and music.

Notes

References

External links 

 (Windows) 
 (GBC) 

1991 video games
Fantasy video games
Game Boy Color games
Horizontally scrolling shooters
Microcabin games
Quest Corporation games
TurboGrafx-16 games
Video games about witchcraft
Video games developed in Japan
Video games featuring female protagonists
Video games scored by Hitoshi Sakimoto
Video games scored by Masaharu Iwata
Windows games